Mirrors is the sixth studio album by American hard rock band Blue Öyster Cult, released on June 19, 1979. It was the first BÖC album not produced by long-time producer and manager Sandy Pearlman, instead being produced by Tom Werman.

Background
After the success of 1976's Platinum Agents of Fortune, 1977's Gold Spectres and 1978's Platinum live effort Some Enchanted Evening, the fact that Mirrors struggled to reach Gold status disappointed band and label alike. According to interviews with the band and production staff, the intent for this album was to make a high-charting record with glossy production; however, the backlash from this attempt led to the band's future pairing with Martin Birch and an attempt to return to a darker sound.

Artwork
The album front cover image is a photorealistic painting by Loren Salazar, of a side-view mirror.  The album’s inner sleeve is an image from the house of mirrors scene in ‘’The Lady From Shanghai’’.

Songs
Allen Lanier's acoustic ballad "In Thee" charted at No. 74. The song's line "Jim says some destinies should not be delivered" references the Jim Carroll Band song "Day and Night."

"The Great Sun Jester" was co-written by Eric Bloom, John Trivers, and British fantasy/science-fiction author Michael Moorcock based on Moorcock's novel The Fireclown.  This would be the first of several songs that Moorcock would co-write with the band.

Track listing

Personnel

Blue Öyster Cult
Eric Bloom – rhythm guitar, vocals
Donald "Buck Dharma" Roeser – lead guitar, vocals
Allen Lanier – keyboards, guitar
Joe Bouchard – bass, vocals
Albert Bouchard – drums, vocals

Additional musicians
Mickey Raphael – harmonica on "Dr. Music"
Jai Winding – strings on "In Thee"
Genya Ravan and Ellen Foley – background vocals on "Dr. Music" and "Mirrors"
 Wendy Webb – background vocals on "Lonely Teardrops"

Production
Tom Werman – producer
Gary Ladinsky – engineer, mixing

Charts

Album

Singles
In Thee

References

Blue Öyster Cult albums
1979 albums
Albums produced by Tom Werman
Albums recorded at Record Plant (Los Angeles)
Columbia Records albums